Kärner is a common Estonian surname (meaning "gardener"), with notable bearers including:

Aleksander Kärner (1880–1942), Estonian politician
Hillar Kärner (born 1935), Estonian chess player
Irmgard Kärner (1927-2014), German chess player
Jaak Kärner (1892–1937), Estonian sport shooter
Jaan Kärner (1891–1958), Estonian poet and writer
Jüri Kärner (1940–2010), Estonian biologist
Olle Kärner (born 1977), Estonian orienteer

Estonian-language surnames
Occupational surnames